Emanuela Grigio (born 7 October 1964) is a visually impaired Italian Paralympic athlete. She won a silver medal and bronze medal.

Career 
She competed at the 1984 Summer Paralympic Games in New York. She won a silver medal, in the 800 meters B2, and a bronze medal in the 400 meters B2.

At the 1988 Summer Paralympic Games in she competed, and earned a fourth place in 400 meters B2, and a sixth place in 800 meters B2. 

Later she participated in the IBSA European Championships in Rome, in 1985.  

She retired from her international athletic career before 1992, devoting herself exclusively to torball (a sport not present at the Paralympics), which she practiced nationally and internationally.

She is the sister of Agnese Grigio .

References 

1964 births
Living people
Paralympic athletes of Italy
Italian female sprinters
Italian female middle-distance runners
Athletes (track and field) at the 1984 Summer Paralympics
Medalists at the 1984 Summer Paralympics
Paralympic sprinters
Paralympic middle-distance runners
Visually impaired sprinters
Visually impaired middle-distance runners
Paralympic silver medalists for Italy
Paralympic bronze medalists for Italy